Hydrovatus rufoniger, is a species of predaceous diving beetle found in India, Bangladesh, Myanmar, Sri Lanka, China, Sumatra, Malaysia, Singapore, Thailand, Vietnam and Australian region.

Subspecies
Two subspecies have been identified.

 Hydrovatus rufoniger politus Sharp, 1882
 Hydrovatus rufoniger rufoniger (Clark, 1863)

References 

Dytiscidae
Insects of Sri Lanka
Insects described in 1863